John Douglas Kilford (8 November 1938 – 2012) was an English professional footballer who played in the Football League for Leeds United and Notts County.

References

1938 births
2012 deaths
English footballers
Association football defenders
English Football League players
Notts County F.C. players
Leeds United F.C. players
Tonbridge Angels F.C. players